Pyuthan District (is a "hill" district some  west of Kathmandu in Lumbini Province in midwestern Nepal. Pyuthan Khalanga is the district's administrative center.

Geography and climate
Pyuthan borders Rolpa district to the west. Of the two upper tributaries of the West Rapti River, Pyuthan contains all of Jhimruk Khola and the lower part of Madi Khola after it exits Rolpa. The Madi-Jhimruk confluence is in southern Pyuthan, in the Mahabharat Range.

The valley of Jhimruk Khola is the core of Pyuthan district.  Its alluvial plain is intensively planted in rice during the summer monsoon.  Wheat is grown as the winter crop. Madi Khola has eroded an inner gorge and is less suited to traditional irrigated agriculture.

Demographics
At the time of the 2011 Nepal census, Pyuthan District had a population of 228,102. Of these, 96.2% spoke Nepali, 2.3% Magar, 0.6% Newar, 0.4% Gurung, 0.1% Tamang, 0.1% Tharu and 0.1% other languages as their first language.

In terms of ethnicity/caste, 32.7% were Magar, 24.9% Chhetri, 14.0% Kami, 9.8% Hill Brahmin, 4.2% Sarki, 3.3% Sanyasi/Dasnami, 3.2% Damai/Dholi, 1.7% Newar, 1.5% Gurung, 1.5% Kumal, 1.1% Thakuri, 0.5% Gharti/Bhujel, 0.5% Tharu, 0.3% Musalman, 0.2% Badi, 0.1% Gaine, 0.1% Lhomi, 0.1% Tamang, 0.1% Thakali and 0.1% others.

In terms of religion, 96.6% were Hindu, 2.8% Buddhist, 0.3% Muslim, 0.2% Christian and 0.1% others.

In terms of literacy, 66.8% could read and write, 2.2% could only read and 31.0% could neither read nor write.

Population by Census 1971-2011

Administrative divisions
Pyuthan district is divided into 9 local level bodies in which two are municipalities and seven are rural municipalities:
 Municipality
Pyuthan Municipality
 Sworgadwari Municipality
 Rural Municipality
Gaumukhi Rural Municipality
Mandavi Rural Municipality
Sarumarani Rural Municipality
Mallarani Rural Municipality
Naubahini Rural Municipality
Jhimruk Rural Municipality
Airawati Rural Municipality

Former VDCs

Arkha
 (Bagdula), Bandikot, Bangemarkot, Bangesal, Baraula, Barjibang, Belbas, Bhingri, Bijaya Nagar, Bijuli, Bijuwar
Chunja
Dakha Kwadi, Damri, Dangbang, Dharampani, Dharmawati, Dhobaghat, Dhubang, Dhungegadhi
Gothibang
Hansapur
Jumrikanda
Khabang, Khaira, Pyuthan Municipality, Khung, Kochibang, (Kwadi)
Libang, Ligha, Lung
Majhakot, Maranthana, Markabang
Narikot, Naya Gaun
Okharkot
Pakala, Phopli, Puja
Rajbara, Ramdi, Raspurkot, (Ratamata)
(Sapdanda), Sari, Swargadwarikhal, Syaulibang
(Tikuri), Tiram, Torbang, Tusara
(Udayapurkot)
Pandeydada khalanga

Historic and cultural sites

 Airabati, Asurkot
 Bandhikot, Bhagawati Temple, Bhawaniswari Temple, Bhimsensthan, Bhimsen Temple (Kutichaur), Bhimsen Temple (Megazun), Bhimsen Temple (Bijbazar), Bhitrikot Cave, Bhitrikot Durbar, Bhringri Kot, Bhumesthan (Khaira), Bijulikot, Birdisthan
 Chhetrapal Temple
 Devi Bhagawati, Devi Bhagawati Temple, Devi Temple, Dhunge Gadhi, Dubanasthan
 Ganesh Temple, Ganeshsthan, Gaumukhi, Gorakhnath Temple (Khaira), Gorakhnath Temple (Dakha Kwadi), Gorakhnath Temple (Bijbazar)
 Jalpadevi Temple, (Bijbazar – Bhagwati), Jalpadevi Temple (Bijbazar), Jhankristhan (Khaira)
 Kalidevi Temple, Kali Temple, Kalika Malika, Khadga Devata Temple,  Khalanga Shivalaya, Khungrikot
 Laxmi Narayan Temple
 Masta Mandau, Mehelnath Temple
 Okharkot
 Phalaharisthan, Pyuthan Magazine
 Radha Krishna Temple, Rameswar Temple, Rani Pauwa
 Saraswati Temple, Sarikot, Shiva Temple (Khaira),Shiva Temple (Lung), Shiva Temple (Bangeshal), Shiva Temple (Khalanga), Shivalaya, Siddha Devatasthan (Belbas), Siddha Sansarsthan (Dakha Kwadi)
 Swargadwari—a hilltop temple complex and pilgrimage site celebrating the importance of cows in Hinduism—is located in the southern part of Pyuthan.
 Tatopani Shivalaya, Tripurasundari, Tusharakot Isnasthan
 Udayapur Kot
 Pandeydada khalanga Shree Satyadevi Bhagwati Mandir, 12-bhai Baraha Dev Mandir

References

External links
blog about Pyuthan
blog about Pyuthan
Mandavi News, Bagdula
IT Supporter

 
Valleys of Nepal
Districts of Nepal established during Rana regime or before